The Black Mirror is a third-person point-and-click horror adventure game developed in 2003 by Czech company Future Games. Its original name is Posel Smrti. The game features 150 locations and 5 hours of spoken dialogue. The Black Mirror became a commercial success, with 500,000 units sold worldwide by 2008. It was particularly successful in Germany, under publisher DTP Entertainment. Two sequels, Black Mirror II: Reigning Evil and Black Mirror III: Final Fear, were released. Additionally, a reboot titled Black Mirror was released on November 28, 2017.

Gameplay

Plot 
The story takes place in August 1981, primarily at Black Mirror, the ancestral manor of the Gordon family located in Suffolk, England. The protagonist, Samuel Gordon, is forced to return to the Black Mirror manor after 12 years absence upon hearing of the death of his grandfather, William Gordon. Despite the mysterious circumstances surrounding William's death, it is considered a suicide by everyone except for Samuel.

Upon his arrival in Black Mirror, Samuel begins his investigation of his grandfather's death. Samuel's investigation soon reveals that his grandfather had interests in the arcane, and up until his death had spent nearly every waking hour working to uncover the mystery of the Gordon family's curse. From his grandfather's writings and other sources, Samuel discovers that centuries ago, in the 1200s, the Gordon line began with two brothers, Marcus and Mordred Gordon. The eldest, Mordred, was a monster of a man, opening a dark portal known as the Black Mirror deep under where the manor now stands. The younger, Marcus, fought his brother, killing him and containing - but not closing - the Black Mirror. In his dying breath the elder cursed the younger, stating that he and his descendants would be forever cursed until five souls were sacrificed and his evil was unleashed once more. William's notes also speak of five sacred keys required to shut the portal for good, entrusted to different members of the Gordon family. Samuel then begins his quest to seek out the five sacred keys and close the Black Mirror permanently.

As the story progresses, further strange and unexpected deaths occur to individuals around Black Mirror, each one accompanied by a strange blood-red sigil. Samuel travels the land around Black Mirror, visiting a local town, chapel, and sanatorium, and also at one point travels to his family's second manor in Wales to obtain a key there. At long last Samuel obtains the five keys, but moments later also discovers the horrifying truth: he is the killer responsible for all the deaths, ending the lives of the victims in his sleep; this is the nature of the Gordon family curse. Samuel enters the catacombs beneath the mansion, enters the Black Mirror, and using the five keys seals the portal. After this, unable to live with the atrocities he has committed, Samuel jumps from the top of the mansion, falling onto the same spiked fence which killed his grandfather.

The game is divided into six chapters:

Chapter I: Return of the Future
Chapter II: Back to the Light
Chapter III: Hidden Legacy
Chapter IV: Forgotten Bound
Chapter V: Confession of the Truth
Chapter VI: Look Through the Mirror

Development
The game's development started in early 2000 with a development team of 5 people. The release date was initially late 2002, but after slight delays, it was released in March 2003.

Reception

Sales
A few weeks after The Black Mirrors initial release in the Czech Republic, Marcel Speta of Future Games reported that it was selling adequately and according to company forecasts. GMX Media president Eugene Perry remarked in March 2004 that the game had "been very successful in every territory", and Future Games saw it as a "solid" seller in the United States. Its global sales left the developer "extremely satisfied" by that May, according to Future's Martin Malík. At the time, it had just launched in Germany, and the company was hopeful regarding its performance in the region. It claimed position #1 on Amazon.de's sales rankings upon release, although Carsten Fichtelmann of German publisher DTP Entertainment noted that certain brick and mortar stores had ordered "very small" shipments, a decision he considered to be a mistake.

The Black Mirror ultimately surpassed DTP's sales forecasts and became a hit in Germany. 4players reported that it was "by far" Germany's most successful adventure title during 2004's first six months, and that its sales proved the adventure genre's health in the country. That September, DTP reiterated that it was performing "extremely well in the German-speaking territories", and that strong sales persisted "many months after" its initial launch. He noted that it was catching up to the sales of DTP's most popular adventure release, Runaway: A Road Adventure, which had sold 60,000 units in Germany and had earlier helped to revive the country's adventure game industry. The Black Mirror maintained its status as Germany's top-selling adventure of 2004 through the end of the year; Chris Kellner of DTP believed that the game's German sales surpassed its commercial performance anywhere else. Alongside Sherlock Holmes: The Case of the Silver Earring and The Moment of Silence, The Black Mirror contributed to DTP's large-scale growth during 2004.

The Black Mirror went on to sell above 100,000 units in Germany alone. According to Future Games, global sales surpassed 500,000 units by late 2008.

Critical reviews

According to Gameswelt, The Black Mirror received harsh reviews from critics in the United States. While most critics praised its dark atmosphere - created mostly by meticulously drawn backgrounds, music, ambiance and realistic animation and sound effects - the quality of the English voice-overs was unsatisfying to many. Other points of criticism include the game's rigid linear structure, pixel hunting elements, plot holes and inconsistencies (acts later revealed to have been committed by certain characters were not possible given their location at the time) and most especially the game's ending.

4Players named The Black Mirror 2004's best adventure game. In 2011, Adventure Gamers named Black Mirror the 83rd-best adventure game ever released.

Legacy

Sequels

German-based Cranberry Production developed a sequel, Black Mirror II, in 2009. It takes place in November 1993, twelve years after the original game. When solitary Darren Michaels befriends the beautiful Angelina Morgan, he has no idea what the fates hold in store for him. The alluring Angelina has also attracted the eye of several others; and when she suddenly disappears, Darren finds himself questioning what has happened to her while he is haunted by a series of torturous and ever-intensifying nightmares. Darren's search for his missing friend and his own sanity take him on a chilling expedition from his small New England town to Willow Creek, England - and the reigning evil of Black Mirror Castle.

Darren's journey will immerse him in the dark secrets and turbulent history of the castle's ill-fated Gordon Family. Legend has it that the Gordons were haunted by an ancient curse that ultimately led to their demise more than a decade earlier.

A second and final sequel by Cranberry Production, Black Mirror III, was released in 2011. The story connects with the end of Black Mirror II, and features a deep, mysterious story, including two playable characters.

Reboot 

KING Art Games and THQ Nordic released Black Mirror, a modern re-imagining of the acclaimed Gothic-horror adventure series. In this game, a new protagonist David Gordon never knew his estranged father particularly well. Still it comes as a shock when he is summoned to his family's ancestral home in the Scottish highlands, after his father has taken his own life there. David does not know much about his father's final weeks, but the circumstances of his death seem more than peculiar. Settling the heritage is merely an excuse for David to find out more about the castle his father grew up in, meeting the family he never knew and for shedding light on the mysteries surrounding his father's death. Scotland, 1926. Following the suicide of his father, David Gordon visits his ancestral home for the first time in his life. A life that is soon threatened by the dark secrets that claimed the sanity of many Gordons before him. Tormented by nightmares and waking dreams for all his life, David fears that it might be his destiny to follow in his father's footsteps, down a path that leads to madness, and death. It is up to David to uncover the horrible truths, buried under generations of silence and fathoms of stone. Black Mirror Castle demands an offering...

References

External links 
 
 
 The Black Mirror at Metacritic

2003 video games
Adventure games
 
2000s horror video games
Point-and-click adventure games
Video games developed in the Czech Republic
Video games set in castles
Video games set in the 1980s
Video games set in England
Video games set in Wales
Video games with pre-rendered 3D graphics
The Adventure Company games
Embracer Group franchises
Windows games
Windows-only games
DTP Entertainment games
Single-player video games